Jacqueline Irles (born May 24, 1957 in Perpignan, Pyrénées-Orientales) is a member of the National Assembly of France.   She represents the Pyrénées-Orientales department, and is a member of the Radical Party.

References

1957 births
Living people
People from Perpignan
Radical Party (France) politicians
Union for a Popular Movement politicians
The Popular Right
Mayors of places in Occitania (administrative region)
Women members of the National Assembly (France)
Women mayors of places in France
Deputies of the 13th National Assembly of the French Fifth Republic
21st-century French women politicians